Dorothea Thiess (1897–1973) was a German stage, film and television actress.

Selected filmography
 Sacred Waters (1932)
 Scandal on Park Street (1932)
 Anna and Elizabeth (1933)
 The Roberts Case (1933)
 The Red Rider (1935)
 The Girl from the Marsh Croft (1935)
 Uncle Bräsig (1936)
 Moscow-Shanghai (1936)
The Chief Witness (1937)
 The Beaver Coat (1937)
 Her First Experience (1939)
 Summer Nights (1944)

References

Bibliography 
 Welch, David. Propaganda and the German Cinema, 1933-1945. I.B.Tauris, 2001.

External links 
 

1897 births
1973 deaths
German film actresses
German stage actresses